Villagonzalo de Tormes is a municipality located in the province of Salamanca, Castile and León, Spain. As of 2016, the municipality has recorded a population of 222 inhabitants.

References

Municipalities in the Province of Salamanca